Puppy Surprise is a toy franchise created by Playskool in 1990. The toy consists of a twelve-inch mother dog and a number of four-inch puppies (a minimum of three and a maximum of five. The gimmick of the toy is that the puppies are contained inside the dog's tummy pouch, fastened by a velcro strip. The number of puppies, their appearance and their genders are a complete surprise until released from the pouch. Every set of dog and puppies were sold separately.

Marketing

1990s
By early 1992, Puppy Surprise marketed by Hasbro and sold commercially in stores. It was one of the biggest successful selling toys on the toy market along with the G.I. Joe doll. Some critics have claimed that the toy encourages careless breeding, while it helped outline how reproduction and overpopulation works. Adding to the Puppy Surprise merchandise were puppy outfits, cots, baby bottles, diapers, and bibs.

2010s
A new brand of multicolored dog and puppy toys came out, along with other animals such as the Unicorn Surprise and the Llamacorn Surprise. Squeezing a puppy would trigger a barking sound, powered by non-replaceable batteries. An additional feature of the toyline is that one of the puppy litter would be smaller than the rest, being the runt.

References

1990s toys
Fictional dogs
Hasbro brands
Hasbro products
Products introduced in 1991
Stuffed toys
Toy animals